Robert James Kerr (29 November 1929 – 13 May 2012) was a Scottish footballer who played as an inside forward or centre forward in the English Football League for Darlington and in the Scottish Football League for Third Lanark, Stirling Albion and Greenock Morton in the 1950s.

Life and career
Kerr was born in Coatbridge in 1929. He played Junior football for Pollok before signing for "A" Division club Third Lanark. He made no first-team appearances before his career was interrupted by National Service commitments with the RAF. In the later part of 1952, he was stationed at RAF Middleton St George, in the north east of England, and Third Lanark allowed him to play for Darlington of the English Third Division North when available to do so. He appeared for Darlington's reserves in the North-Eastern League, as well as in Services football, before making his senior debut in the Third Division on 20 December, replacing Ken Murray at inside left for a 3–0 defeat away to Southport. Later in the season, he had a run of games, also in place of Murray, and took his total to ten by the end of the season. He scored twice, at home to Accrington Stanley in March and Stockport County in April; on each occasion it was the only goal of the match.

Kerr returned to Third Lanark for the 1953–54 season, by which time they had been relegated to the "B" Division. He made his first appearance on 16 January 1954 in a 3–0 win away to Dunfermline Athletic, replacing George Dobbie, who had been posted abroad, and kept the place for the remaining 12 league matches, during which he scored 10 goals. He was less of a regular in the 1954–55 season, at the end of which he was transfer listed at a fee of £1000. Bradford City of the English Third Division were interested, and were reported to have held talks with the player, but no move took place.

An appeal to the Scottish League's management committee to have his fee reduced was successful, and he joined "A" Division club Stirling Albion. He appeared at outside right in the opening match of the season, but went on to play in only 15 top-flight matches, scoring three goals. He was released at the end of the season, and spent 1956–57 with Morton in the second tier, in which he appeared equally infrequently but with a significantly better goal return, with twelve goals from his 15 outings.

He was variously described as "well built", "hefty", and "big and strong", as well as being a scorer of spectacular goals.

Kerr died in Edinburgh in 2012 at the age of 82.

Club statistics

References

1929 births
2012 deaths
Footballers from Coatbridge
Scottish footballers
Association football forwards
Pollok F.C. players
Third Lanark A.C. players
Darlington F.C. players
Stirling Albion F.C. players
Greenock Morton F.C. players
English Football League players
Scottish Football League players